Rock Creek is the southern boundary of Cheyenne Mountain and a tributary of Fountain Creek at Fort Carson in Colorado.

See also
List of rivers of Colorado

References

Rivers of Colorado
Rivers of El Paso County, Colorado
Cheyenne Mountain